, also Lake Notori or Notoro Lagoon, is a coastal lagoon by the northern shore of Abashiri, Hokkaidō, Japan. It is included in Abashiri Quasi-National Park.

It is the 13th-largest lake in Japan.

References

Notoro
Notoro